Emu Creek or Emu Creek Station is a pastoral lease and cattle station located approximately  east of Coral Bay and  south east of Exmouth in the Pilbara region of Western Australia.

The property was established in 1891 and occupied an area of almost . Initially sheep were run at Emu Creek and some 20,000 were pastured and shorn in the early years.

See also
 List of ranches and stations
 List of extreme temperatures in Australia

References

Pastoral leases in Western Australia
Pilbara
Stations (Australian agriculture)
1891 establishments in Australia